The House of Martin Guerre is a musical written by Leslie Arden (music, lyrics & co-book) and Anna Theresa Cascio (co-book). It is inspired by the 16th century French peasant Martin Guerre.

Production History 
It was first produced by Theatre Plus under the direction of Duncan McIntosh in Toronto (1993) at the Jane Mallett Theatre. It was then developed further by the Canadian theatrical producer Livent and went on to be produced by Chicago's Goodman Theatre in 1996. It was directed by David Petrarca. Variety said the show was “so fresh, so resoundingly complete and rewarding, that there is talk her first major show may yet land on Broadway”.  

In 1997, it was once again produced in Toronto by the Canadian Stage Company again directed by David Petrarca. 

In 2018, it was performed in concert at the Charlottetown Festival in Prince Edward Island, starring Adam Brazier, Joseé Boudreau, Rebecca Poff and Craig Fair. Narration was provided by Julain Molnar, who originated the role of Bertrande.

Awards

References

1993 musicals
Biographical musicals
Canadian musicals
Plays set in the 16th century
Plays set in France